Kazanka is the name of several rural localities in Russia.

Primorsky Krai
As of 2009, one rural locality in Primorsky Krai bears this name:
Kazanka, Primorsky Krai, a selo under the administrative jurisdiction of the town of Partizansk

Republic of Tatarstan
As of 2009, two rural localities in the Republic of Tatarstan bear this name:
Kazanka, Arsky District, Republic of Tatarstan, a village in Arsky District
Kazanka, Cheremshansky District, Republic of Tatarstan, a selo in Cheremshansky District

Other
Kazanka, name of several other rural localities in Russia

References